Seaborn is a given name and a surname. Notable persons with that name include:

Persons with the given name
 Seaborn Buckalew, Jr. (1920–2017), American judge and politician
 Seaborn McDaniel Denson (1854–1936), American musician and singing teacher
 Seaborn Jones (1788–1864), American politician from Georgia
 Seaborn Jones (poet), (1942–2014), American poet
 Seaborn Reese (1846–1907), American politician, jurist and lawyer
 Seaborn Roddenbery (1870–1913), American politician from Georgia

Persons with the surname
 J. Blair Seaborn (1924–2019}, a Canadian diplomat
 Jim Seaborn (1890–1964), Canadian ice hockey player
 Richard Seaborn (1917–1991), Canadian politician from Manitoba
 Robert Seaborn (1911–1993), Canadian bishop
 Rodney Seaborn (1912–2008), Australian psychiatrist and performing arts philanthropist

Characters
 Sam Seaborn, a fictional character portrayed by Rob Lowe on the television serial drama The West Wing

See also
 Seaborn Networks, a developer and operator of submarine communications cables
 Seaborne (disambiguation)
 Seabourn (disambiguation)
 Seabourne, a surname 
 Seaburn, a seaside resort in England

English-language surnames
Surnames of British Isles origin
Americanized surnames